Colegio La Fe is an Institution designed to offer a pertinent alternative of comprehensive education for children, adolescents and young people, who seek to position themselves with an excellent level of competitiveness in the different areas in which they will have to act in the future, providing them with a solid academic, moral and civic position that convert them into useful, disciplined, honest, responsible and socially sensitive citizens to our national reality, so that they strive to generously give the best of themselves, for the benefit of themselves, their families and the community in which they live. Private School in Naguanagua, Venezuela. Founded on October 11, 1992, by Professor Enrique Correa Trujillo and Iraima Sanchez Lopez.

References

External links
Official site

Buildings and structures in Carabobo
Educational institutions established in 1992
Schools in Venezuela
1992 establishments in Venezuela